"Love You Down" is the title of an R&B song written by Melvin Riley Jr. Riley's former band, Ready for the World, originally recorded the song in 1986 and released it as the lead single from their second album, Long Time Coming produced by Gary Spaniola. A slow jam, "Love You Down" was a hit on the Billboard pop and R&B charts, spending two weeks atop the R&B chart in December 1986 and peaking at #9 on the pop chart in early 1987. This was Ready for the World's second R&B chart-topper, following the success of "Oh Sheila" in 1985. It also reached #24 on the Billboard adult contemporary chart. The song charted in the United Kingdom at #60 on the UK Singles Chart. The song has been covered by artists such as R&B singer INOJ and neo soul musician Me'shell Ndegeocello.

Charts

INOJ version 

Female R&B vocalist INOJ recorded a cover version of "Love You Down" in 1997 with the assistance of producer Charles "The Mixologist" Roane and Lonnie Hill Jr Known as "Lon2". Featuring a faster beat and more percussion than the original version, INOJ's cover was initially featured on So So Def Recordings' So So Def Bass All-Stars Vol. 2 compilation album. Shortly after the compilation's release in late June 1997, the song began amassing airplay, entering Billboard'''s Hot 100 Airplay chart on the issue dated August 2, 1997; it would go on to spend 45 weeks on that chart, becoming especially popular on rhythmic radio. A music video, directed by Eric Haywood and Rubin Whitmore in Atlanta, premiered in August. A physical single, also containing Lathun's "Freak It" from the same So So Def compilation, was later released in January 1998, making the song eligible for the Hot 100. The song ultimately reached #25 on that chart. "Love You Down" was later included on INOJ's debut album, incidentally titled Ready for the World'', released by So So Def and Columbia in the summer of 1999. INOJ released the 20th anniversary of "Love You Down" on July 28, 2017.

Charts

See also 
List of number-one R&B singles of 1986 (U.S.)

External links 
Ready for the World single info from discogs.com
INOJ single info from discogs.com

References 

1986 songs
1996 songs
1986 singles
1997 debut singles
1980s ballads
Ready for the World songs
INOJ songs
MCA Records singles
So So Def Recordings singles
Contemporary R&B ballads